The Miyako toad (Bufo gargarizans miyakonis) is a subspecies of the Asiatic toad that is native to the Miyako Islands, in the Ryūkyū Islands of Japan.

Taxonomy
In 1927, Japanese zoologist Okada Yaichirō included Bufo bufo miyakonis (Schlegel) in a study of the country's "tailless batrachians"; however, no further details were provided, making this a nomen nudum. The Miyako toad was first described, as Bufo bufo miyakonis, i.e., as a subspecies of the Common toad, by Okada in 1931, with Miyako-jima in the Ryūkyū Islands given as the type locality. In 1947, Inger, arguing that Okada did not sufficiently distinguish his new subspecies from the Asiatic toad of China, treated this name as a synonym of Bufo bufo gargarizans. In 1980,  et al., based on laboratory crosses, recommended the toad be treated as a subspecies of the Japanese common toad, as Bufo japonicus miyakonis. In 1984,  concluded the Miyako toad was a subspecies of the Asiatic toad, i.e., Bufo gargarizans miyakonis. Though sometimes thought to have been introduced, a Late Pleistocene fossil bufonid has been identified from Miyako-jima.

Description
The Miyako toad is somewhat warty, but less so than the Japanese common toad. It has a grey-brown to reddish-brown back with some paler spots and stripes, and a whitish belly with some black spots. Its width is around 36% of its SVL, its hand and arm length, 44%, the length of its tibia, 35% in males and 33% in females, and its relatively flat parotoid gland, c. 17%. Males have black nuptial pads. There is no vocal sac.

Distribution and habitat
The Miyako toad is native to Miyako-jima and Irabu-jima in the Miyako Islands, where it lives among the grasses and fields of sugarcane, but has also been introduced to Okinawa Island as well as Kitadaitō-jima and Minamidaitō-jima in the Daitō Islands.

Ecology
The Miyako toad's diet largely comprises small invertebrates such as ants, beetles, snails, and worms. The breeding season runs from September to March. Its mating call includes five distinct notes, lasting in total some 1.5 seconds.

Conservation
The Miyako toad is classed as Near Threatened on the Ministry of the Environment Red List.

See also

 List of amphibians of Japan
 List of Natural Monuments of Japan (Okinawa)
 Irabu Prefectural Natural Park
 Pinza-Abu Cave Man

References

Bufo
Amphibians of Japan
Amphibians described in 1931
Endemic fauna of the Ryukyu Islands
Miyako Islands